SA-500 may refer to:

Stolp SA-500 Starlet, American amateur-built aircraft
SA-500D, prototype NASA Saturn V rocket used for dynamic testing
SA-500F, prototype NASA Saturn V rocket used for facilities integration